Lajonquierea is a genus of moths in the family Lasiocampidae. The genus was erected by Holloway in 1987.

Species
Lajonquierea deruna Moore, 1859
Lajonquierea derunoides Holloway, 1987
Lajonquierea falcifer Holloway & Bender, 1990
Lajonquierea jermyi Holloway, 1987
Lajonquierea mediofasciata Grünberg, 1913
Lajonquierea piccoloptera Holloway, 1987
Lajonquierea poeciloptera Grünberg, 1913
Lajonquierea variabile Holloway, 1987

References

Lasiocampidae